This is a list of Attalea species, a genus in the Arecaceae, the palm family.

 Attalea allenii H.E.Moore
 Attalea amygdalina Kunth
 Attalea amylacea (Barb.Rodr.) Zona
 Attalea anisitsiana (Barb.Rodr.) Zona
 Attalea apoda Burret
 Attalea attaleoides (Barb.Rodr.) Wess.Boer
 Attalea barreirensis Glassman
 Attalea bassleriana (Burret) Zona
 Attalea brasiliensis Glassman
 Attalea brejinhoensis (Glassman) Zona
 Attalea burretiana Bondar
 Attalea butyracea (Mutis ex L.f.) Wess.Boer
 Attalea camopiensis (Glassman) Zona
 Attalea cephalotus Poepp. ex Mart.
 Attalea cohune Mart.
 Attalea colenda (O.F.Cook) Balslev & A.J.Hend.
 Attalea compta Mart.
 Attalea crassispatha (Mart.) Burret
 Attalea cuatrecasana (Dugand) A.J.Hend., Galeano & R.Bernal
 Attalea dahlgreniana (Bondar) Wess.Boer
 Attalea degranvillei (Glassman) Zona, Palms
 Attalea dubia (Mart.) Burret<ref>{{Cite web|url=https://wcsp.science.kew.org/namedetail.do?name_id=17788|title=Attalea dubia (Mart.) Burret, Notizbl. Bot. Gart. Berlin-Dahlem 10: 516 (1929).|website=World Checklist of Selected Plant Families|access-date=2019-04-27}}</ref>
 Attalea eichleri (Drude) A.J.Hend.
 Attalea exigua Drude
 Attalea fairchildensis (Glassman) Zona
 Attalea funifera Mart.
 Attalea geraensis Barb.Rodr.
 Attalea guacuyule (Liebm. ex Mart.) Zona
 Attalea guianensis (Glassman) Zona
 Attalea hoehnei Burret,
 Attalea huebneri (Burret) Zona
 Attalea humilis Mart. ex Spreng.
 Attalea iguadummat de Nevers
 Attalea insignis (Mart.) Drude
 Attalea kewensis (Hook.f.) Zona
 Attalea lauromuelleriana (Barb.Rodr.) Zona
 Attalea leandroana (Barb.Rodr.) Zona
 Attalea luetzelburgii (Burret) Wess.Boer

 Attalea macrocarpa (H.Karst.) Linden
 Attalea macrolepis (Burret) Wess.Boer
 Attalea magdalenica (Dugand) Zona
 Attalea maracaibensis Mart.
 Attalea maripa (Aubl.) Mart.
 Attalea maripensis (Glassman) Zona
 Attalea microcarpa Mart.
 Attalea moorei (Glassman) Zona
 Attalea nucifera H.Karst.
 Attalea oleifera Barb.Rodr.
 Attalea osmantha (Barb.Rodr.) Wess.Boer
 Attalea pacensis M.Moraes & Pintaud
 Attalea peruviana Zona
 Attalea phalerata Mart. ex Spreng.
 Attalea pindobassu Bondar
 Attalea plowmanii (Glassman) Zona
 Attalea princeps Mart.
 Attalea racemosa Spruce
 Attalea rhynchocarpa Burret
 Attalea rostrata Oerst.
 Attalea salazarii (Glassman) Zona
 Attalea salvadorensis Glassman
 Attalea seabrensis Glassman
 Attalea septuagenata Dugand
 Attalea speciosa Mart.
 Attalea spectabilis Mart.
 Attalea tessmannii Burret
 Attalea vitrivir Zona
 Attalea weberbaueri (Burret) Zona
 Attalea wesselsboeri'' (Glassman) Zona

References

List
Attalea
Attalea